Agron Shehaj (born December 8, 1977) is an Albanian politician and entrepreneur. He was elected as one of the 140 deputies of the Assembly of the Republic of Albania, following the parliamentary elections of June 25, 2017. Shehaj is a member of the Democratic Party of Albania.

Background
Agron Shehaj was born in the coastal city of Vlorë, southern Albania. He emigrated to Italy with his family in 1991. There, he completed his high school education in Bolzano and later enrolled to study economics in Florence. In 2005, he decided to return to Albania and quickly climbed the ladder of success in the field of the telemarketing business. He manages the "Sestante Holding" group of companies that operate extensively throughout Europe and North America, while being one of the largest employers in the Albanian market.

Shehaj co-founded the "Lumo Skëndo Institute of Historical Studies" along with historian Uran Butka. His Kujto.al digital archive is an initiative of the "Foundation for the Remembrance of the Victims of Communism in Albania". In Tirana, he is the main sponsor of youth football club Spartak.

Political activity
Shehaj started his involvement in politics in 2017 as leader of the Democratic Party list in Vlorë. His political activism has mainly stood out in denouncing corrupt tenders, protecting the historic national theater building and supporting people in need.
He is married and has 3 children.

References

Living people
Democratic Party of Albania politicians
1977 births
Members of the Parliament of Albania
People from Vlorë
21st-century Albanian politicians